Tonka is a Croatian, Slovene and  Slovak feminine given name that is a diminutive form of Antonia and Antonija used in Croatia and Slovenia, as well as a nickname. Notable people with this name include the following:

Given name
Tonka Obretenova (1812 – 1893), known as Baba Tonka, Bulgarian revolutionary
Tonka Petrova (born 1947), Bulgarian middle-distance athlete
Tonka Tomicic (born 1976), Chilean model

Nickname/Stage name
DJ Tonka, stage name of Thomas-René Gerlach (born 1973), male German electronic music artist.
Tonka, nickname of Paul Chapman (musician) (born 1954), Welsh rock guitarist
Tonka, nickname of Ray Stewart (Scottish footballer) (born 1959), male Scottish footballer

Surname
Hubert Tonka (born 1943), French sociologist and urban planner

Fictional characters
Tonka, nickname of Kevin Tonkinson, Mike Bassett: Manager character
Tonka, James Corden character in Twenty Four Seven, 1997 British film

See also

Tonka, given name of Bully XIX (2000 – 2011), Mississippi State Bulldogs mascot (2001 – 2009), English Bulldog
Donka (name)
Tona (name)
Tonda (name)
Tonga (name)
Tonja (name)
Tonko
Tonia (name)
Tonra, a surname
Tonya (given name)

Notes

 Croatian feminine given names
 Slovene feminine given names